Asayan, originally known as  was a talent search variety show that aired on TV Tokyo from 1995 to 2002. Some idols that were originally discovered through Asayan auditions produced by Tsunku, formed groups that worked under the umbrella group, later to be named as the Hello! Project.

Morning Musume and Chemistry were formed from idols that made a debut in Asayan, but also solo artists like Ami Suzuki and Yumi Matsuzawa debuted in the show.

Cast

MC

Narration 
 
 
 

1995 Japanese television series debuts
2002 Japanese television series endings
1990s Japanese television series
2000s Japanese television series
Japanese variety television shows
TV Tokyo original programming